Dirk Zimmer (2 October 1943 – 26 September 2008), called Dizi, was a German artist and an illustrator and writer of American children's books.

Biography

Zimmer was born in Goslar in Lower Saxony. He grew up mostly in Hamburg, where he attended the University of Fine Arts of Hamburg from 1963 to 1968.

The German period
In 1965, he, with fellow artists Francesco Mariotti, Herman Prigann, Werner Nöfer, and Dieter Glasmacher, cofounded Cruizin 4, an art organization best known for two events: the opening of the exhibition Cruizin 4 in the Gallery Mensch at Fischmarkt Hamburg-Altona and a performance at Cosinus, a pub in the university district. The Happening 1. World Record in Permanent Painting took place under medical, and specifically psychiatric care, too, by doctors of the University Hospital Eppendorf. (The planned on about 80-hour performance was canceled after 36 hours on medical advice because of collapse of one of the participants).

Under the moniker 'Dizi', Zimmer had a brief career as a painter during the German avant-garde movement and then turned to filmmaking, which he eventually dropped in the late 1970s to work as an illustrator for such American publications as Crawdaddy, The New York Times, and The New-York Magazine. Over the years, both his paintings and illustrations were shown in private galleries in New York, Germany, Switzerland, and France.

The American period
His work as a children's book illustrator began after moving permanently to New York City in 1977. He also continued to exhibit his artwork and to be a presence in the New York art scene. He found a flat in John Street, right under the roof, for a lengthy period of time. The only media contact to his homeland was through the German Boa Vista magazine, in which he first published vignettes, than later his written and illustrated (from 1977, New York) short-story comic with the cryptically and untranslatable German title Die mysteriöse Schratzmichlöse. From 1978 to 2004 Zimmer published more than two and a half dozen kid's books. 
Zimmer moved to Barrytown, NY in the early 1980s, and later lived in the Rondout area of Kingston. He was a contributor and collaborator at the northern Dutchess quarterly AboutTown. He later moved to Tivoli, NY. In 1990, he was one of a small group of illustrators—including Natalie Babbitt, 
Maurice Sendak, Marc Simont and Barbara Cooney—whose work was featured in The Big Book for Peace (Dutton, 1990), an anthology of 34 artists and writers.

Car accident and death
In Tivoli, on a walk to the river on the afternoon of September 21, 2008, Zimmer was struck by a car. He died five days later  on September 26 from his wounds at St. Francis Hospital in Poughkeepsie, N.Y. He is survived by two sisters who live in Germany. The sequel of the book Egon (published 1980), on which he was working at that time, was left unfinished. Egon, Zimmer's adventurous, furry alter ego, leaves the following note at the end of the book: "I am having a good time. I will be home some day but not until the show ends. Maybe soon."

Legacy
Zimmer's offbeat, sometimes grotesque, but always gentle humor made him one of the most sought-after illustrators for "scary" picture books, two of which were selected as American Library Association Notable Book lists for children's books.
The Trick-Or-Treat Trap—the only book that he has written and illustrated by himself, got the most resonance and response in criticism. So The New York Times praised the humor of this work with the adjective "tongue-in-cheek": "His pen has bite as he pictures a wonderfully wicked assortment of ornery little beings."

Bibliography

Books in cooperation

In German
 1982 Egon by Larry Bograd. Reinbek bei Hbg., Carlsen Verlag (Reinbeker Kinderbücher), Reinbek bei Hamburg.

In English
 1968 The Iron Giant: A Story in Five Nights by Ted Hughes
 1978 Felix in the Attic by Larry Bograd
 1980 Egon by Larry Bograd
 1981 Mean Jake and the Devils by William H. Hooks
 1983 Bony-Legs by Joanna Cole; Esteban and the Ghost by Sibyl Hancock
 1984 In a Dark, Dark Room and Other Scary Stories by Alvin Schwartz
 1985 Buster Loves Buttons by Fran Manushkin; Someone Saw a Spider: Spider Facts and Folktales by Shirley Climo
 1986 Poor Gertie by Larry Bograd; Perrywinkle and the Book of Magic Spells by Ross Madsen
 1987 Curse Squirrel Bk/Cass by Laurence Yep; The Naked Bear: Folktales of the Iroquois by John Bierhorst; Sky is Full of Song by Lee Bennett Hopkins
 1989 Weird Wolf by Margery Cuyler; Windy Day: Stories and Poems by Caroline Feller; John Tabor's Ride by Edward C. Day
 1990 The Big Book for Peace by Lloyd Alexander
 1991 The Cow Is Mooing Anyhow: A Scrambled Alphabet to Be Read at Breakfast by Laura Geringer
 1992 Moonbow of Mr. B. Bones by J. Patrick Lewis; The One That Got Away (children's book)|The One That Got Away by Percival Everett
 1993  Tsugele’s Broom by Valerie Scho Carey
 1994 Seven Spiders Spinning (The Hamlet Chronicles # 1) by Gregory Maguire
 1995 Some Fine Grumpa! by Alan Arkin
 1996 One Eye, Two Eyes, Three Eyes: A Hutzul Tale; The Great Turtle Drive by Steve Sanfield
 1997 Perrywinkle's Magic Match by Ross Martin Madsen
 2004 An I Can Read Halloween Treat by Michele Sobel Spirn
2006 Jake the Gardener: Guide Dog Digs Treasure by E. S. Aardvark

Books by himself
 1982 The Trick-Or-Treat Trap, Harper & Row

Awards, honours
 1978 Irma Simonton Schwarz Award from the Bank Street College of Education for Felix in the Attic, Harvey House

References

External links

 
 

1943 births
2008 deaths
American children's book illustrators
German artists
German male writers
People from Goslar